Mary "May" Ingraham (30 July or June 1901 – 26 March 1982) was a Bahamian suffragist who, among other things, was the founding president of the Bahamas Women's Suffrage Movement.

Suffragist 
Along with Georgianna Symonette, Eugenia Lockhart and Mabel Walker, Ingraham founded the Women's Suffrage Movement.

In 1962, women gained the right to vote and serve in elected office in the legislature. By 1967 black women had organized themselves into a strong voting block that contributed to the Progressive Liberal Party's win and eventually Majority rule.

Recognition 
Mary Ingraham Intergenerational Care Centre – in Nassau at St. Vincent Road and Faith Avenue – is named for Ingraham. The centre is under the purview of the Department of Social Services and Community Development within the Bahamas Ministry of Social Services and Urban Development and is operated by the South Bahamas Conference of the Inter-American Division of Seventh-day Adventists.

The Bahamas Post Office, on October 10, 2012, issued commemorative panes – six different postage stamps per pane, titled 50th Anniversary of Women Suffrage (two rows, clockwise, from the top left):
<li> Mary Ingraham – 15¢
<li> Georgianna Symonette (1902–1965) – 25¢
<li> Mabel Walker (1902–1987) – 50¢
<li> Eugenia Lockhart (1908–??) – 65¢
<li> Dame Alberta Isaacs – 70¢
<li> Dame Doris Johnson (1921–1983) – 80¢
  each of the six stamps bearing the portrait of notable women who influenced women's suffrage in The Bahamas.

Affiliations 
In the past Ingraham was a Daughter Ruler of the Improved Benevolent and Protective Order of Elks of the World and a Matron of the Order of Eastern Stars.

Family 
Mary Ingraham was born in the St. Agnes Chapelry District, Nassau, Bahamas, to Ellis Hartman Mason ( Ellis Henry Mason; 1872–1937) and Alice Leanora Bartlett (died 1942). On December 30, 1919, she married Rufus Harcourt Ingraham (1900–1967) in Grant's Town, one of the Over-the-Hill suburbs south of Nassau. St. Agnes Church (Anglican), still in existence, has endured for  years. Three of Ingraham's brothers were musicians in the United States:
<li> Norman Mason (1895–1971), a Dixieland clarinetist, multi-instrumentalist, bandleader;
<li> Oliver Welock Mason ( 1900; d. 1961), a trumpeter who, in the 1930s and 1940s, performed with the orchestra for the traveling minstrel show, Silas Green from New Orleans.
<li> Henry Morris Mason ( 1906), a trumpeter who, among other things, recorded as a sideman for Fannie Goosby (1928 – Brunswick 7029), Cleo Gibson (1929 – Okeh 8700), Blanche Calloway (1931 – Victor 22866; 1934 – Banner 33304 & 33224), Leon Abbey (1938 – Sonora Swd 3411 & 3799), Willie Lewis (1941 – Elite Special 4067, 4068, 4069, 4070, 4071), Eddie Brunner (1941 – Elite Special), and Gene Sedric ( 1940s – Collectors Items 017).

Bibliography

Notes

References 

 . . ; and 

 

 
 

  Retrieved January 22, 2021 (subscription required; accessible at many libraries)

 NARA publication no. T627; digital folder no. 5460974; microfilm image no. 310.</ref>

   (Note: William-Pulfer, in 2018, completed her PhD at Indiana University–Purdue University Indianapolis).

1901 births
1982 deaths
Bahamian suffragists
People from New Providence